Rock Glen is an unincorporated community located in Black Creek Township in Luzerne County, Pennsylvania. Rock Glen is located along Tomhicken Road and the Black Creek, west of Hazleton and south of Nescopeck.

References

Unincorporated communities in Luzerne County, Pennsylvania
Unincorporated communities in Pennsylvania